The Hungarian Working People's Party (abbr. MDP) was the ruling communist party of Hungary from 1948 to 1956.

It was formed by a merger of the Hungarian Communist Party (MKP) and the Social Democratic Party of Hungary (MSZDP).  Ostensibly a union of equals, the merger had actually occurred as a result of massive pressure brought to bear on the Social Democrats by both the Hungarian Communists, as well as the Soviet Union. The few independent-minded Social Democrats who had not been sidelined by Communist salami tactics were pushed out in short order after the merger, leaving the party as essentially the MKP under a new name. Its leader was Mátyás Rákosi until 1956, then Ernő Gerő in the same year for three months, and eventually János Kádár until the party's dissolution. Other minor legal Hungarian political parties were allowed to continue as independent coalition parties until late 1949 but were completely subservient to the MDP.

During the Hungarian Revolution of 1956, the party was reorganized into the Hungarian Socialist Workers' Party (MSZMP) by a circle of communists around Kádár and Imre Nagy. The new government of Nagy declared to assess the uprising not as counter-revolutionary but as a "great, national and democratic event" and to dissolve State Security Police (ÁVH). Hungary's declaration to become neutral and to exit the Warsaw Pact caused the second Soviet intervention on 4 November 1956. After 8 November 1956, the MSZMP, under Kádár's leadership, fully supported the Soviet Union.

Chief functionaries of the Hungarian Working People's Party

Leader

Chairman

Electoral history

National Assembly elections

See also 
History of Hungary
Politics of Hungary
List of political parties in Hungary
Eastern Bloc politics

References

1948 establishments in Hungary
1956 disestablishments in Hungary
Communist parties in Hungary
Defunct political parties in Hungary
Eastern Bloc
Hungarian People's Republic
Hungarian Revolution of 1956
Parties of one-party systems
Political parties disestablished in 1956
Political parties established in 1948
Formerly ruling communist parties
Social Democratic Party of Hungary